Meadow Lake Airport  is a public use airport located 14 nautical miles (16 mi, 26 km) northeast of the central business district of Colorado Springs, a city in El Paso County, Colorado, United States. It is privately owned by the Meadow Lake Airport Association, Inc.

Meadow Lake is the largest pilot owned airport in the State of Colorado.  Meadow Lake Airport went in service on November 1, 1967 and is a general aviation reliever airport for Colorado Springs.  There are several aviation related businesses on the airfield including flying schools and aircraft maintenance facilities.  In 2010 the airport was approved for an FAA grant to provide an AWOS (automated weather observation system). The system has been installed, and it was certified by the FAA on October 21, 2010. A change of FAA identifier from 00V to FLY (ICAO: KFLY) took effect on January 14, 2011.

Although most U.S. airports use the same three-letter location identifier for the FAA and IATA, this airport is assigned FLY by the FAA, but has no designation from the IATA (which assigned FLY to Finley, New South Wales, Australia).

Facilities and aircraft 
Meadow Lake Airport covers an area of 753 acres (40 ha) at an elevation of 6,874 feet (2,095 m) above mean sea level. It has three runways: 15/33 is 6,000 by 60 feet (1,829 x 18 m) with an asphalt surface; 8/26 is 2,084 by 35 feet (635 x 11 m) with an asphalt/gravel surface; N/S is 1,800 by 15 feet (549 x 5 m) with an asphalt/turf surface.

For the 12-month period ending December 31, 2010, the airport had 59,100 aircraft operations, an average of 161 per day: 69.5% general aviation and 30.5% military. At that time there were 325 aircraft based at this airport: 88% single-engine, 4% multi-engine, 1% jet, 3% helicopter, 3% glider, and 2% ultralight.

Accidents and incidents
On December 7, 2006, a Piper Archer crashed into a tree while attempting to land at the airport. The pilot suffered minor injuries.

On April 3, 2022, a Piper Cherokee 235 crashed at Meadow Lake Airport sending three people to the hospital.

References

External links 
 Official sites: MeadowLakeAirport.com or kFLY.us
 Meadow Lake Airport at Colorado DOT website

Airports in Colorado
Transportation buildings and structures in El Paso County, Colorado
Airports established in 1967
1967 establishments in Colorado